Lakshmi Sharma mononymously known as Lahari is an Indian actress. After debuting in Telugu cinema, where she failed to gain a foothold, she became an actress in Malayalam cinema, after entering the industry in 2006 with Palunku. She has acted in few Kannada films as well.

Career
She hails from Vijayawada, Andhra Pradesh. She was born into a Brahmin family to a Telugu father and a Kannada mother. 

After her parents' retirement, the family settled in Hyderabad. She wanted to become an actress in the Telugu film industry and debuted in a supporting role in E. V. V. Satyanarayana's Ammo! Okato Tareekhu (2000). She went on to lead roles in the films Manamiddaram and Vacchina Vaadu Suryudu, which failed, before she got a role in the Chiranjeevi film Indra (2002). Her role as the niece of Chiranjeevi's character in the film was noted. She said that other than that film she hadn't "any moment of luck or happiness" in the industry. Disappointed with the response in Telugu, she moved to the Malayalam film industry where she rose to fame.

She made her Malayalam debut in Palunku in 2006. Although the film did not do well, she was continuously offered roles and was one of the busiest and most prolific actresses in Malayalam cinema by 2009 though she was mocked for her poor performances and eventually faded out.

Filmography

Film

Television

References

External links

Lakshmi Shrama at MSI

Indian film actresses
Actresses in Malayalam cinema
Actresses in Tamil cinema
Actresses in Telugu cinema
Actresses in Kannada cinema
Actresses from Vijayawada
Living people
21st-century Indian actresses
Indian television actresses
Actresses in Telugu television
Actresses in Malayalam television
1985 births